Published since 1901, Editor & Publisher (E&P)  originally focussed on reporting stories centered on the traditional, legacy news publishing industry, having been described for decades as the “bible of the newspaper industry.” Today E&P reports on all aspects of news media and multimedia news publishing.

Originally based in New York City, the magazine's offices are currently located in Brentwood, Tennessee.

Overview 
Editor & Publisher (E&P) covers all aspects of the news media industry. The magazine's original tagline was "The newsmagazine of the fourth estate." E&P's current tagline is "The Authoritative Voice of #NewsMedia Since 1884"

Today E&P still publishes a monthly print magazine that is mailed to over 5,000 news publishing executives and distributed at yearly news media events such as the Borrell Miami local advertising conference, America’s Newspapers’ News Industry Mega Conference and Niche Media. The EditorandPublisher.com Website has over 45,000 monthly unique visitors which offers archived news media information on improving industry diversity, equity and inclusion. Building multimedia audience. Garnering all forms of advertising revenue. Finding efficiency in news publishing operations.  And the latest information on news media compensation issues from “big tech” companies like Google & Facebook, with updates concerning anti-trust lawsuits, and government legislation like the Journalism Competition & Preservation Act (JCPA) (H.R. 1735 and S. 673).

E&P also works in conjunction with America’s Newspapers to post the latest news media industry news, and information about news industry people. Highlights from these Websites are sent to over 40,000 email subscribers each weekday at 12-noon eastern time in the industry newsletter #NewsMedia Today.

E&P’s yearly EPPY Awards® are considered the news publishing industry’s most prestigious honor for excellence in digital publishing. CNN, The Wall Street Journal, The New York Times, The Washington Post and The Newmark Graduate School of Journalism are just a few of the news organizations recently recognized with an “EPPY.”

History 

Editor & Publisher evolved from several publications, the oldest of which — the weekly The Journalist, the first successful American trade newspaper covering journalism — had been founded in 1884. The Editor & Publisher: A Journal for Newspaper Makers   itself was founded in 1901, and in 1907 it merged with The Journalist. E&P  later acquired the trade journal Newspaperdom (established 1892), and in 1927 it merged with the trade paper The Fourth Estate.

E&P published the long-awaited King–Crane Commission Report (officially called the 1919 Inter-Allied Commission on Mandates in Turkey) in its December 2, 1922 edition.

From 1990 to 2010, Editor and Publisher produced the Interactive Newspapers Conference (which changed its name to the Interactive Media Conference & Trade Show in the year 2000). MediaWeek joined as a co-sponsor in 2003. The annual conference was held in various locations around the United States, frequently in New Orleans and Las Vegas. Since 1996, E&P has presented the EPPY Awards, an award for media-affiliated websites. The EPPYS were presented at the Interactive Media Conference until 2011 when they went fully online.

For many years the company published the Editor & Publisher International Yearbook. It still publishes the annual Editor & Publisher DataBook and this data is also available on the website.

Editor & Publisher was acquired in 1999 by the Nielsen Company. Nielsen shut down E&P at the end of 2010, but the magazine was revived when the Duncan McIntosh Company purchased it from Nielsen and moved its offices to the Los Angeles area.
In September 2019 Editor & Publisher was purchased by author of "Survival Selling" and media consultant Mike Blinder's Curated Experiences Group.

Since 2020, Blinder has hosted a podcast/video series called "E&P Reports." Guests have included columnist Mike Barnicle, USA Today editor-in-chief Nicole Carroll, American political news commentator Chris Stirewalt, businessman and politician Stewart W. Bainum Jr and the president of the Council of Foreign Relations, Richard Haass.

In October of 2020 Editor & Publisher partnered with The Poynter Institute and America's Newspapers to launch the Media Job Board , an industry wide news media employment platform. News publishers who post their openings on the Job Board have their ads automatically placed on many job matching platforms, the Websites of Poynter, Editor & Publisher Magazine and America's Newspapers with their latest ads featured on the daily #NewsMedia today Email Newsletter and on Editor & Publisher's social media platforms.

In January 2021, the magazine donated their digitized "back issues" to Internet Archive where now hundreds of issues of E&P published since 1901 are available for free.

See also 
 Press Gazette - covering British newspaper industry

References

External links 
 
 

1901 establishments in New York City
Monthly magazines published in the United States
News magazines published in the United States
Magazines established in 1901
Magazines published in California
Professional and trade magazines
Magazines published in New York City